Kirk Hershey (July 7, 1918 – January 23, 1979) was a player in the National Football League. He was drafted in the seventeenth round of the 1941 NFL Draft by the Cleveland Rams and split that season between the Rams and the Philadelphia Eagles.

References

1918 births
1979 deaths
Players of American football from Philadelphia
American football ends
Carroll Pioneers football players
Cornell Big Red football players
Cleveland Rams players
Philadelphia Eagles players